The Abhidharmadīpa or Lamp of Abhidharma is an Abhidharma text thought to have been authored by Vasumitra as a response to Vasubandhu's Abhidharmakośakārikā.

The text consists of verse and prose commentary. It currently survives as an incomplete collection of Sanskrit fragments. However, the text is valuable insofar as it confirms the identity of Vasubandhu as author of the Abhidharmakośakārikā.

References

Mahayana texts
Abhidharma